Ifonyintedo is a town located in Ipokia Local Government Area of Ogun State in the South-western part of Nigeria. Founded in 1935, the town has grown to an estimated population of 10,000. It is primarily a farming community; however, commercial activities have increased recently owing to its proximity to the border with Republic of Benin. 
The people are predominantly Yoruba who speak the Anago dialect.

There are various community development organizations involved in efforts to bring progress to the town among which are Ifonyintedo Development Union and Ifonyin Progressives.

Populated places in Ogun State